Jean-Nickolaus Tretter  (1946 – December 9, 2022) was an American activist and LGBT archivist who created the Jean-Nickolaus Tretter Collection in Gay, Lesbian, Bisexual and Transgender Studies, housed by  the University of Minnesota.

Tretter was also the host of KFAI radio show Night Rivers, and the co-chair of the Minnesota Gay and Lesbian Olympic Committee. He co-organised the first Twin Cities commemoration of the Stonewall Riots in 1972.

Early life, education and military service 
Tretter grew up in Little Falls, Minnesota and studied initially linguistics. His family had arrived in Morrison County in 1848.

After graduating, Tretter served with the U.S. Navy in the Vietnam War. From 1973, he studied cultural anthropology at the University of Minnesota, although faculty prevented him from focussing his studies lesbian and gay anthropology. Tretter dropped out of university in 1976.

Career and activism 

After dropping out of university, Tretter worked at a home in Ramsey County for people with disabilities, while also undertaking private study on gay and lesbian history.

He spent sixteen years as the producer and host of the gay and lesbian classical radio show Night Rivers, hosted on KFAI radio.

In 1972, Tretter and his friends organised the first Twin Cities commemoration of the Stonewall Riots. Around the same time, he started collecting LGBT themed items.

In 1982, Tretter became the co-chair of the Minnesota Gay and Lesbian Olympic Committee. The committee sent the third biggest delegation to the games and Tretter arranged for the torch run to pass though the Twin Cities.

In 1983 Tretter created a gay history exhibit at St. Paul's Landmark Center.

Tretter helped to develop the LGBTQ+ scene in Minneapolis, including establishing Twin Cities Pride, co-founding the Minnesota Committee for Gay Rights, and serving as manager of the Noble Roman and other gay bars across the Twin Cities.

Tretter's LGBT collection grew over the decades and he donated it to the Andersen Library in Minnesotain 2000. He worked as an archivist at the collection until retirement in 2011. Post-retirement he served on an advisory board and supported academics focussing on LGBT history.

Personal life and death 
Tretter came out about his sexuality in the early 1970s, after leaving the Navy. 

He died in Saint Paul, Minnesota, on December 9, 2022, at the age of 76.

References

1946 births
2022 deaths
American activists
People from Little Falls, Minnesota
Military personnel from Minnesota
University of Minnesota alumni
United States Navy personnel of the Vietnam War
American LGBT rights activists
American archivists
American radio hosts
LGBT museums and archives
LGBT archivists

External links 

 The Jean-Nickolaus Tretter Collection in Gay, Lesbian, Bisexual and Transgender Studies, Digital Transgender Archive.
 Tretter (Jean-Nickolaus) Night Rivers audiocassette collection, Online Archive of California